Qaradağ Lökbatan FK is an Azerbaijani football club based in Lökbatan.

History 
The club was established in 2009 under the name of Neftchi-ISM as Neftchi Baku's reserve team, and played in Azerbaijan First Division. However, reserve teams cannot play in the same division as their senior team and therefore the club was ineligible for promotion to the Azerbaijan Premier League. The club became independent of Neftchi in 2011 and was renamed Qaradağ Lökbatan FK, which would allow them to participate in Premier League if they secured promotion from the First Division.

On 10 April 2012, the club finished top in the First Division, which would normally result in promotion to Azerbaijan Premier League. However, after a decision of the Association of Football Federations of Azerbaijan about licensing, club was not promoted.

Stadium 

Lökbatan Olympic Sport Complex Stadium is a football stadium is a multi-use stadium in Lökbatan settlement of Baku, Azerbaijan.  It is currently used as the club's home stadium and holds 2,500 people.

Honours 
Azerbaijan First Division
 Winners (1): 2011–12

League and domestic cup history

Current squad 
(captain)''

Managers 
 Asim Ibrahimov (2011) 
 Adil Mahmudov (2011–2014)
 Afgan Talibov (2015–2017)
 Habib Aghayev (2017–2018)
 Elchin Dargahguliyev (2018– present)

References

External links 
 FK Qaradağ at PFL.AZ

Football clubs in Azerbaijan
Association football clubs established in 2008
2008 establishments in Azerbaijan